The Battle of Jelgava was an operation of the Latvian Army from 15 to 21 November 1919 during the Latvian War of Independence. The Latvian Army forced the units of the Western Russian Volunteer army subordinated to the Weimar Republic to leave Jelgava.  Because of this attack, the German Government's intention to start ceasefire talks and reach agreement on the further political status of Courland and Zemgale with Latvian Provisional Government failed.

The main battle took place in Ozolnieki district.

References

1919 in Latvia
Jelgava, Battle of
Jelgava (1919), Battle of
Jelgava (1919), Battle of
Jelgava (1919), Battle of
Independence of Latvia